Argoed is a Welsh word, meaning 'by a wood'. It is the name of several places:

Places 
Argoed, Caerphilly
Argoed railway station
Argoed, Flintshire
Argoed High School
Argoed, Shropshire
Argoed, Powys
The Argoed, Penallt is a house near Monmouth, Wales
 Afan Argoed Country Park is the local name for Afan Forest Park near Port Talbot

Other uses 
Battle of Argoed Llwyfain is a poem by Taliesen about Owain mab Urien